Konstantin Batygin is an American astronomer and Professor of Planetary Sciences at Caltech.

Early life 
Konstantin Batygin was born in Moscow, Soviet Union. His father, Yuri Konstantinovich Batygin, worked as an accelerator physicist in the Moscow Engineering Physics Institute until 1994, when he moved along with his wife Galina and their family to Wakō, Japan, and began working at the particle accelerator facility in RIKEN. There, Konstantin graduated from a public Japanese elementary school, later attending a Russian embassy-based school and studying the martial art Gōjū-ryū.

In late 1999, at age 13, Konstantin Batygin moved to Morgan Hill, California along with his family. He chose to attend the University of California, Santa Cruz (UCSC) for the beach and the chance to keep playing in his rock band, The Seventh Season. During his sophomore year as an undergraduate, he met Gregory P. Laughlin, and afterwards they began working together on the Solar System’s long-term dynamical evolution. In June 2008, he graduated with a B.S. degree in Astrophysics, winning the Loren Steck Award for his thesis, "The Dynamical Stability of the Solar System". Batygin subsequently obtained a Ph.D. degree in Planetary Science in 2012 from California Institute of Technology.

Career
Batygin's research is primarily aimed at understanding the formation and evolution of planetary systems. In 2010, he and David J. Stevenson published a calculation, which showed that hot Jupiters can become inflated as a consequence of Ohmic dissipation of electrical currents induced through an interaction between ionized atmospheric winds and the planetary magnetic field. In 2012, Batygin demonstrated that misalignments between stellar spin-axes and planetary orbits can arise from gravitational perturbations exerted onto protoplanetary disks by primordial companions stars. In 2015, Batygin and Laughlin hypothesized that the Solar System once possessed a population of short-period planets that were destroyed by Jupiter's migration through the solar nebula. In January 2016, Batygin and Michael E. Brown proposed the existence of a ninth planet in the Solar System. In 2018, Batygin showed that the evolution of astrophysical disks can be modeled with the Schrödinger equation, a fundamental equation in quantum mechanics. He has appeared as himself in multiple television documentaries including the NOVA 2019 miniseries The Planets.

See also
 List of astronomers

References

External links
 
 Curriculum Vitae, caltech.edu

1986 births
Living people
21st-century American astronomers
California Institute of Technology alumni
California Institute of Technology faculty
Russian emigrants to the United States
University of California, Santa Cruz alumni
Planetary scientists